The Richmond Oak Grove Plantation was a historical plantation located on the Savannah River, near present-day Port Wentworth, Georgia. Richmond Oak Grove Plantation was at its largest size in the late-nineteenth century after three plantations – Richmond and Kew, Morton Hall and Oak Grove – consolidated into one plantation.

History

Oakgrove and Morton Hall 
Oakgrove and Morton Hall were plots of land in Joseph's Town that first appeared in 1735. John would abandon his plot soon after it was granted to him and most documentation about his presence ceased. Starting operations with at least ten indentured servants, Patrick settled some of his property though quickly requested slaves from authorities after his servants died of sickness. Over the next decade, very little was produced at the plantations.

In 1749, the Georgia Trustees ended their ban on slavery. Mackay was later granted an additional  of his brother's plot of land in 1756 and a year later, it was reported that he had owned "fifty-three negroes". Mackay was one of the first to introduce large-scale slavery in Georgia, owning hundreds of slaves. He often hid slaves from the Georgia Trustees, at times sneaking about one-hundred slaves across the Savannah River between the Province of Georgia and the Province of South Carolina in efforts to dodge investigations. Slaves were brought in from a port located on the plantation, with a main road lined with oak trees leading to a neighbor plantation, the Mulberry Grove Plantation. By 1763, it was advertisements about runaway slaves showed that slave quarters were probably present on the land. The two plantations would rapidly change ownership. John M. Berrien later obtained the plantations where he had about fifty slaves.

Richmond and Kew 
The Richmond and Kew plots, comprising a large marsh only suitable for rice farming, did not see development until slavery was legalized in 1749. In 1772, the plantations were the most valuable in the parish with British loyalist Alexander Wright, son of governor of the Province of Georgia James Wright, purchasing the land for 10,500 Pound sterling. 

Prior to the confiscation, Wright ordered British forces to destroy a barn, machinery, rice and other crops on the plantation.

The plantations were officially given to Wayne in 1786 and received loans from Dutch bankers. Wayne would later purchase slaves from Adam Tunno, records state that a "number of negroes" were present at the plantations, with the slaves tasked with farming and making various repairs. His plantations were ultimately unsuccessful as he made poor business decisions and acquired a large debt to Tunno following his slave purchase, later begging various acquaintances to assist him with making payments. Wayne would sell the properties after President George Washington called for his leadership during the Northwest Indian War.

Consolidation 
By 1940, the plantation was abandoned.

See also 

 Plantation complexes in the Southern United States
 List of plantations in Georgia (U.S. state)
List of plantations in the United States

References 

Plantations in Georgia (U.S. state)